The Otis–Lennon School Ability Test (OLSAT), published by the successor of Harcourt Assessment—Pearson Education, Inc., a subsidiary of Pearson PLC—is, according to the publisher, a test of abstract thinking and reasoning ability of children pre-K to 18. The Otis-Lennon is a group-administered (except preschool), multiple choice, taken with pencil and paper, measures verbal, quantitative, and spatial reasoning ability. The test yields verbal and nonverbal scores, from which a total score is derived, called a School Ability Index (SAI). The SAI is a normalized standard score with a mean of 100 and a standard deviation of 16. With the exception of pre-K, the test is administered in groups.

Test components 
The test has twenty-one subtests that are organized into five areas—verbal comprehension, verbal reasoning, pictorial reasoning, figural reasoning, and quantitative reasoning—each with equal numbers of verbal and non-verbal items:

The number of questions and the time limit varies accordingly:

The Verbal Section
The Verbal section consists of Verbal Comprehension and Verbal Reasoning questions. The Verbal Comprehension questions are made up of four types of questions: Following Directions, Antonyms, Sentence Completion, and Sentence Arrangement. This section is used to evaluate a child's ability to observe and comprehend relationships between words, to build sentences, and to understand different definitions of words based on context. There are seven types of Verbal Reasoning questions: Aural Reasoning, Arithmetic Reasoning, Logical Selection, Word/Letter Matrix, Verbal Analogies, Verbal Classification, and Inference. This section assesses a child's ability to determine relationships between words, to observe similarities and differences, and to apply conclusions in different scenarios.

The Nonverbal Section
The Nonverbal section consists of three sections: Pictorial Reasoning, Figural Reasoning, and Quantitative Reasoning. In the Pictorial Reasoning section, there are three types of questions: Picture Classification, Picture Analogies, and Picture Series. This section evaluates a child's ability to reason using different images and illustrations, to find similarities and differences, and to comprehend and continue progressions.

The Figural Reasoning Section 
The Figural Reasoning category is made up of four question types: Figural Classification, Figural Analogies, Pattern Matrix, and Figural Series. This section is used to assess a child's ability to utilize geometric shapes and figures in order to determine relationships, comprehend and continue progressions, and compare and contrast different figures. There are three different types of questions on the Quantitative Reasoning section: Number Series, Numeric Inference, and Number Matrix. This section assesses a child's ability to determine relationships with numbers as well as figure out and utilize computational rules.

Scores
OLSAT score reports are received via mail approximately two months following the test. The OLSAT results are reported as the raw score; the School Ability Index (SAI), which compares the results to others of the same age group; and the percentile rank, which also ranks the result with others of the same age group.

Uses in primary and secondary education 
There are seven different levels of the OLSAT designed for use from kindergarten to 12th grade.  Each level of the OLSAT corresponds to a grade. For example, children in the 2nd grade generally take the OLSAT Level C. Some OLSAT levels correspond to more than one grade (e.g. the OLSAT Level A is administered to students in both pre-k and kindergarten). See the table below for each grade's corresponding test level. The OLSAT serves several purposes: it provides a marker for measuring individual year-to-year progress; some teachers may find it helpful for inferring individual educational needs; and for some school systems, it serves as an economical way to widely assess gifted and talented candidates in the early years.

The Level A OLSAT, the publisher’s lowest level, is designed to assess school abilities of kindergartners (up to a level of "above average"), but it assesses areas that are not universally taught (i.e., it does not assess reading and math abilities).  Some educators use the Level A test to assess preschoolers, but, for three-year-olds, require only 40 of the 60 questions.  For four-year-olds, all 60 questions are given.  Scoring is measured against peers in age groups of 3-month bands.  For example, children born October 4 through January 4 are compared with each other and children born January 4 through April 4 with each other and so on.

Uses with other tests for inferring gifted and talented needs 
In 2012 the New York City Department of Education (NYC DOE) adjusted its criteria for inferring gifted and talented needs of students in kindergarten through the third grade.  Citing a disproportionate number of students scoring in the 99th percentile — the far right tail of the distribution curve — the NYC DOE replaced the Bracken (BSRA) with the Naglieri Nonverbal Ability Test (NNAT), and changed the weighting, lowering the OLSAT from two-thirds to one-third and giving the NNAT two-thirds.

A local news source reported that many parents were unhappy about the decrease in the weighting of the OLSAT and the implementation of the NNAT.  The objective, according to the NYC DOE, was to combat the advantages of children receiving pretest tutoring.  The NYC DOE avers that the OLSAT is more preppable and the NNAT is less preppable.

Prior to September 2006, the New York City public schools had long used the Stanford Binet for G&T screening.  But after a competitive bidding process, the NYC DOE awarded a five-year, $5.3 million contract to Harcourt Assessment to provide testing materials for its pre-kindergarten through 2nd grade gifted and talented admissions, to provide professional development for teachers and administrators, and to provide parent informational materials. Under the contract, Harcourt will develop and implement the scoring methodology and closely track scoring trends to ensure proper test administration.

Uses by high-IQ societies 
High scores on the OLSAT are accepted by high IQ societies such as American Mensa (requiring a total SAI ≥ 132) and Intertel (requiring a total SAI ≥ 138), the latter also accepting scores on this test's historical predecessor, the OLMAT.

History 
The name Otis-Lennon reflects the surnames of two people:  (i) the "pre-OLSAT" developer of the original test, Arthur Sinton Otis, Ph.D. (who died before OLSAT was published) and (ii) the test editor and publishing executive, Roger Thomas Lennon, Ph.D., who adopted and marketed Otis' concepts as a school ability test.

Otis (28 July 1886 – 1 January 1964) is best known for the multiple choice intelligence tests he developed for the U.S. Army. As a doctoral student under Lewis Terman in 1917 he developed the group-administered tests titled the Army Alpha (for literates) and the Army Beta (for illiterates). Otis developed it to improve cost and time efficiency as compared to one developed by Alfred Binet (1857–1911), which was individually administered. Given in multiple-choice format and administered in groups, 1.7 million World War I recruits took the Army Alpha test. The results were published in 1921 and included the relative performance of recruits of different national origins.

Some historians credit Fredrick James Kelly, Ph.D.,(1880–1959) of the University of Kansas, for inventing the multiple choice format (also known as Multiple Choice Questions or MCQ) in 1914. However, Otis was the first to use it on a large scale in the Army Alpha test.

Otis was also a major contributor as a test editor for the World Book Company, which later became part of Harcourt Brace Jovanovich. World Book Company is not related to World Book, Inc., the Chicago-based encyclopedia publisher. The OLSAT was first published by Harcourt in 1979.

Lennon (1916–1985) was an executive and head of the testing division of Harcourt Brace Jovanovich as well as a chairman of one of its subsidiaries, The Psychological Corporation. Later he became a senior vice president of the publishing house. He retired in 1981 as associate to the chairman.

Criticisms 
Accuracy

 The fact that the OLSAT is easier and less expensive to administer than an IQ test, such as the Stanford Binet V or the Wechsler Intelligence Scale for Children, makes it more accessible; but its accuracy at higher levels is less reliable. High scores on the OLSAT are nevertheless accepted as qualifying evidence by high IQ societies such as Mensa and Intertel.

Test environment

 Preschoolers taking the OLSAT for gifted and talented (G&T) kindergarten programs are more likely to be aware that they are taking a test. For that particular age, the test is given one-on-one. The test is presented in a multiple choice format, and either the child fills in the "bubble" or the tester does it for them.  By contrast, many psychological, intelligence, and school ability tests (or assessments) are administered by psychologists who discreetly take notes while conducting introspective thinking activities. Under these conditions, the child is often unaware of being evaluated.

Test format for preschoolers

 Some testing scholars have published concerns over whether the multiple-choice aspect of testing encourages guesswork over independent thinking.

Preparing for the test

 For the 2007–08 school-year, New York City began using the OLSAT to infer gifted pedagogical needs of public school children entering kindergarten through 3rd grade.  Preschools – and a cottage industry of test preparation companies – soon thereafter began offering OLSAT test-preparation.  OLSAT attempts to infer "school ability" for a particular grade.  In New York City, a preschooler being screened for a gifted pedagogy at the kindergarten level would simply be assessed using the OLSAT that measures kindergarten scholastic ability.  OLSAT test preparation programs for preschoolers have essentially incorporated an OLSAT oriented kindergarten curriculum.

Editions
1st ed. — Otis-Lennon School Ability Test (published August 13, 1979)
2nd ed. — Otis-Lennon School Ability Test (published September 10, 1982)
6th ed. — Otis-Lennon School Ability Test (published November 15, 1988)
7th ed. — Otis-Lennon School Ability Test (published October 23, 1995)
8th ed. — Otis-Lennon School Ability Test

References

External links
 Journal of Psychoeducational Assessment, SAGE Publications  
 OLSAT Website, Pearson Education

Standardized tests
Student assessment and evaluation
Cognitive tests
Intelligence tests